Qeblehi Rural District is a rural district (dehestan) in the Central District of Dezful County, Khuzestan Province, Iran. At the 2006 census, its population was 25,108, in 5,121 families.  The rural district has 26 villages.

References 

Rural Districts of Khuzestan Province
Dezful County